Guilherme Marchi (pronounced Gih-lare-mee Mar-kee) (born July 22, 1982) is a Brazilian former professional rodeo cowboy who specialized in bull riding, and competed in the Professional Bull Riders (PBR) circuit. He was the 2008 PBR World Champion.

Background
He is from Leme, São Paulo, and is of Italian descent on his father's side. He rode his bulls right-handed. His special interests include soccer, team roping, and surfing.

Career
Marchi competed very briefly in the Championship Bull Riding (CBR) tour in 2004 before joining the PBR full-time. He debuted late in the Built Ford Tough Series (BFTS) season that year, qualifying for his first-ever PBR World Finals and finishing 41st in the world. After finishing in the runner-up position for the PBR World Championship in three consecutive years, he won his world title in 2008. Statistically, Marchi was one of the most consistent riders on the tour. He would go on to qualify for the World Finals all 15 years of his PBR career (2004 to 2018).

In 2005, Guilherme Marchi was the biggest threat to Justin McBride’s dream of being the PBR World Champion. McBride won, Marchi came in second. However, Marchi was the PBR World Finals event champion that year. 

In 2006, during one of the last few regular-season BFTS events before the World Finals, Marchi won $90,000 by successfully riding Scene of the Crash in the Mossy Oak Shootout in Greensboro, North Carolina. At the World Finals, Marchi once again failed to win when fellow Brazilian Adriano Moraes came from behind to claim the PBR world championship, with Marchi placing second. 

Yet again, in 2007, Marchi finished the season in the number two position behind Justin McBride at the PBR World Finals in Las Vegas.

In 2008, Marchi dominated the PBR circuit, riding nearly 75% of his bulls, winning five events, and earning over $1.5 million (nearly three times as much as any other PBR rider) on his way to his PBR world championship title and the $1 million bonus that went with it.

In March 2014, in the opening round of the BFTS event in Phoenix, Arizona, Marchi became the first bull rider to successfully complete 500 qualified rides in the PBR, riding Pandora’s Pyxis.

On April 8, 2017, Marchi rode Shocker for 86.25 points in Round 2 of the BFTS event in Billings, Montana. In doing so, he became the first PBR rider to reach 600 qualified rides and received a commemorative belt buckle.

On August 12, 2018, Marchi announced that 2018 would be his final year of bull riding, with the intention of retiring after the PBR World Finals. He finished his professional career with 635 qualified rides (the most ever in PBR history), 36 PBR event wins, and over $5.3 million in career earnings.

Retirement
Marchi officially retired from bull riding following his victory at the 2018 PBR Brazil event in Goiânia, Goiás.

Honors
On November 5, 2019, Marchi was inducted into the PBR Ring of Honor.

On May 14, 2022, Marchi was inducted into that year’s class of the Bull Riding Hall of Fame. However, he did not attend the ceremony.

Personal
On April 19, 2018, Marchi married long-time girlfriend Maria in Texas. She is his second wife. They have a son. Marchi also has two other children, a daughter and son, from his first wife, Patricia.  All of his children were born in the United States. While competing in the U.S. PBR circuit, Marchi lived in Ferris, Texas. After retiring from bull riding, he moved back to Brazil with his family.

References

External links
Guilherme Marchi Profile at PBR.com

1982 births
Living people
People from Leme, São Paulo
People from Ferris, Texas
Rodeo in Brazil
Bull riders
Professional Bull Riders: Heroes and Legends